The Lost Session is an EP by English rock band Def Leppard. It was released on 19 January 2018 and is exclusive to iTunes Store and Apple Music services.

Background 
The Lost Session was recorded in 2006 specifically for the iTunes Store, but the long running dispute between Def Leppard and Universal Music Group over digital royalties that ended in early 2018 prevented it and everything else in the band's catalog from being released digitally.

Lead singer Joe Elliott said in an interview, "The Lost Session (is) from about ten years ago and we just couldn't remember where we did it, why we did it. We re-recorded "When Love & Hate Collide". Which is actually better than the album version I think."

Track listing

Personnel 
Joe Elliott – lead vocals
Phil Collen – guitar, backing vocals
Vivian Campbell – guitar, backing vocals
Rick Savage – bass, backing vocals
Rick Allen – drums

References 

2018 EPs
2018 live albums
Def Leppard EPs
Def Leppard live albums
ITunes-exclusive releases
Live EPs
Mercury Records EPs